BBU may refer to:

Places
 Aurel Vlaicu International Airport (IATA airport code: BBU), Romania
 Bhabua Road railway station (train station code: BBU), Mohania, Bihar, India

Brands, products, items
 Backup battery unit
 Base Band Unit, found in IEEE 1914.1
 Volkswagen BBU, a gasoline engine; see List of Volkswagen Group petrol engines

Companies, groups, organizations
 Brookfield Business Partners (stock ticker: BBU)
 Bank of Baroda Uganda Limited
 Bimbo Bakeries USA
 Verband Berlin-Brandenburgischer Wohnungsunternehmen (BBU), part of GdW Bundesverband deutscher Wohnungs- und Immobilienunternehmen
 Beijing Bailie University, Beijing, China
 Build Bright University, Phnom Penh, Cambodia
 Ballistic Bomb Unit, an RAF squadron; see List of RAF squadron codes
 Baptist Bible Union of the General Association of Regular Baptist Churches
 BBU (band), American hip hop group
 Bennett Bowtell Urquhart, Australian supergroup music band

Other uses
 Kulung language (Jarawan) (ISO 639 code: bbu)

See also

 
 
 BU (disambiguation)
 2BU (disambiguation)